Kani Guzlah (also Romanized as Kānī Gūzlah; also known as Kānī Kūzlah) is a village in Akhtachi-ye Mahali Rural District, Simmineh District, Bukan County, West Azerbaijan Province, Iran. At the 2006 census, its population was 111, in 22 families.

References 

Populated places in Bukan County